Angelo Simmons (born 20 July 1987) is a Bermudian footballer who plays as a forward for Dandy Town Hornets.

Club career
Simmons began his career as a striker with Boulevard Blazers before joining the Bermuda Hogges in the USL Second Division. He returned to the local league to play for Dandy Town Hornets and also had a short spell in England with non-league Carshalton Athletic. As of October 2022, he was still with Dandy Town and captaining the team.

International career
Simmons made his debut for Bermuda in a September 2011 World Cup qualification against Guyana and has, as of November 2015, earned a total of seven caps, scoring one goal. He has represented his country in six FIFA World Cup qualification matches.

Career statistics
Scores and results list goal tally first.
Scores and results list Bermuda's goal tally first, score column indicates score after each Simmons goal.

References

External links
 

1987 births
Living people
Association football forwards
Bermudian footballers
Bermuda international footballers
Bermuda under-20 international footballers
Bermuda youth international footballers
USL League Two players
Bermuda Hogges F.C. players
Dandy Town Hornets F.C. players
Carshalton Athletic F.C. players
Bermudian expatriate footballers
Bermudian expatriate sportspeople in England
Expatriate footballers in England